Playmen TV is a Canadian English language specialty channel. It is a premium adult entertainment television channel aimed at gay men, with programming consisting mainly of adult films and adult-related television series.

Playmen TV's licensee is 4510810 Canada Inc. which is wholly owned by Fifth Dimension Properties Inc., a company wholly owned by Stuart Duncan, majority owner of Ten Broadcasting.

History

PrideVision was launched in 2001 as Canada's first digital specialty service aimed towards the LGBT community. However, PrideVision had been unattractive to providers because of the gay pornographic programming it aired during east coast late-night hours, which would be broadcast as early as 10:00 p.m. in the Pacific Time Zone. Providers chose to package PrideVision as a standalone, premium adult channel rather than alongside other mainstream specialty channels—which hampered the network's reach. Shaw controversially required viewers to go through an authorization process, including a one-cent fee, to view the channel during its mandated free preview period. The provider considered this mechanism to be a response to the "overwhelming expressions of concern from our customers" over the adult content carried by the service, but PrideVision's owners filed a complaint to the CRTC alleging that Shaw was discriminating against the channel by refusing to give it a proper preview period, like the other digital channels that had also recently been launched. The CRTC reprimanded Shaw for its unfair treatment of PrideVision, and ordered that the provider properly offer a preview.

In 2003, PrideVision was sold to a consortium led by veteran broadcaster William Craig. in September 2004, the ownership group filed an application with the CRTC for a new premium specialty service that would be "devoted to adult entertainment for the gay genre audience." Later in November, PrideVision re-branded its adult programming block as Hard on PrideVision, and expanded it to run from 9:00 p.m. to 6:00 a.m. ET.

In February 2005, Craig officially announced that Hard on PrideVision would be spun off as a new, 24-hour channel of the same name for gay adult programming, and PrideVision would be relaunched as OutTV. Craig argued that the changes would allow more adult programming to be made available to viewers, while allowing OutTV to achieve wider carriage and increase its investments into programming of interest to the LGBT community. Hard on PrideVision's license was approved by the CRTC on March 4, 2005.

On July 19, 2006, Shavick Entertainment, a film and television producer based in Vancouver, British Columbia, announced their intent to purchase a majority stake in Hard on PrideVision and OutTV from then majority owner William Craig. The transaction was finalized later that year, with other investors shares changing to reflect Shavick's new ownership.

In November 2006, Hard on PrideVision was renamed HardTV.

On December 3, 2009, the CRTC approved an application on behalf of 4510810 Canada Inc, a newly formed company owned by Pink Triangle Press (55%) and Peace Point Entertainment (45%), that would see it acquire HardTV from 6166954 Canada Inc. The transaction closed at a later date.

In the spring of 2013 HardTV was rebranded as Playmen TV after ownership in the company was transferred to Fifth Dimension Properties Inc. in April 2013.

Logos

References

External links
  (Note: adult content)

English-language television stations in Canada
Canadian pornographic television channels
Gay culture in Canada
LGBT-related mass media in Canada
Television channels and stations established in 2005
Digital cable television networks in Canada
Gay pornographic television channels
Commercial-free television networks
2005 establishments in Canada